ZAKSA Kędzierzyn-Koźle 2017–2018 season is the 2017/2018 volleyball season for Polish professional volleyball club ZAKSA Kędzierzyn-Koźle.

The club competes in:
 Polish SuperCup
 Polish Championship
 Polish Cup
 FIVB Club World Championship
 CEV Champions League

Team roster

Squad changes for the 2017–2018 season
In:

Out:

Most Valuable Players

Results, schedules and standings

2017 Polish SuperCup
On September 23, 2017 PGE Skra beat ZAKSA Kędzierzyn-Koźle and achieved their third Polish SuperCup in history. Bartosz Bednorz was awarded a title of the Most Valuable Player.

2017–18 PlusLiga

Regular season

2017 FIVB Club World Championship

Pool A

2017–18 CEV Champions League

Pool E

Playoff 12
The draws of the match pairs for the playoffs of 12 were held on March 2, 2018 in Luxembourg. ZAKSA was one of three Polish teams in this phase.

Playoff 6

Semifinal

References

ZAKSA Kędzierzyn-Koźle seasons